The ATP and WTA rankings are updated weekly on Mondays (UTC) or at the conclusion of a two-week tournament.

ATP singles

ATP doubles

WTA singles

WTA doubles

See also 
 ATP rankings
 WTA rankings

References

External links 
 ATP official website
 WTA official website

ATP Tour
WTA Tour
Tennis rankings
Sports world rankings